The Colter Bay Lakeside Trail is a  roundtrip hiking trail in Grand Teton National Park in the U.S. state of Wyoming. From the Colter Bay Marina trailhead, two short loop hikes from Colter Bay Village are connected by a causeway. The trail follows the shoreline of Jackson Lake with the Teton Range off to the west across the lake.

See also
 List of hiking trails in Grand Teton National Park

References

Hiking trails of Grand Teton National Park